The Great Stupa of Dharmakaya Which Liberates Upon Seeing is located at the Shambhala Mountain Center in Colorado, USA. It was built to inter the ashes of Chogyam Trungpa, who died in 1987. In many Buddhist traditions it is common to build a stupa to honour a respected teacher after their death.
The site of the Great Stupa of Dharmakaya was first identified as an auspicious location by the 16th Karmapa, head of the Kagyü school of Tibetan Buddhism, on his first visit to North America in 1974.

Construction of the stupa began in 1988. The structure took thirteen years to complete and used a special concrete formula designed to last one thousand years. The Stupa was consecrated in a ceremony that lasted several days in the summer of 2001. This ceremony was attended by many important lamas and students of Chogyam Trungpa.

In September 2006, The Dalai Lama visited the Great Stupa for the first time.

References

External links 
 The Great Stupa of Dharmakaya
 The Great Stupa of Dharmakaya video

Asian-American culture in Colorado
Buddhism in Colorado
Buildings and structures in Larimer County, Colorado
Religious buildings and structures completed in 2001
Tibetan Buddhism in the United States
Buddhist temples in the United States
Religious buildings and structures in Colorado
Stupas in the United States
21st-century Buddhist temples